Suzuki GSV-R is the name of the series of four-stroke V4 prototype motorcycles developed by Suzuki to compete in the MotoGP World Championship. The GSV-R replaced Suzuki's 500 cc two-stroke V4 RGV500 which was ridden by Kenny Roberts Jr. to win the 500cc World Championship in 2000.

The GSV-R was introduced on 2002, one year earlier than the original plan, with codename XRE0. New regulations were promoting the growth of four-stroke engines, and the performance of the new engine during testing was strong according to Suzuki. Despite the use of a new engine, XRE0 was using the old RGV500 Gamma Chassis, which was later criticized as a big mistake by many MotoGP analysts. Using the chassis and fairings that were previously made for the two-stroke RGV500 engine, XRE0 was hampered by many stability issues. The use of RGV500 Tyre spec was another mistake. Despite all of that, XRE0 was able to taste its first podium (2nd place) on the opening round at Suzuka and got third place at Rio in the same year. XRE0 achievements however were inconsistent, as the riders often fell down, crashed, or were forced to retire by technical failures. The top XRE0 rider by the end of The 2002 MotoGP Championship was Kenny Roberts Jr. in ninth place overall.

For 2007, MotoGP rules were changed to allow a maximum displacement of 800 cc. Suzuki introduced an 800 cc version of the GSV-R also known as GSV-R800.  The GSV-R800 was codenamed XRG0 because of its newly redesigned engine based on displacement limitations.  The new XRG0 engine was based from the layout of the 2006 990 cc GSV-R however, the XRG0 engines bore, stroke, and cylinder pitch had been redesigned to better suit the 800 cc engine displacement.  The factory Rizla Suzuki MotoGP team stated the new engines aim was to ‘achieve the best possible horsepower and reliable high rpm operation, and to provide the riders with user friendly power delivery and predictable engine character.’   The XRG0 was also equipped with a redesigned engine control unit supplied by Mitsubishi, capable of producing 220 horsepower at 17,500 rpm.  The chassis layout and wheelbase length from the 2006 GSV-R XRE4 used in the 2006 MotoGP season remained on the new model, however the fairing design had been updated to better accommodate high speed stability.

The 2008 MotoGP season brought another redesigned GSV-R800 that Suzuki codenamed XRG1 as the successor to the XRG0 of the previous year.  This second generation 800 cc four-stroke prototype was the most complex and technically advanced racing motorcycle Suzuki had ever produced at its time.  The XRG1 had been developed closely with team riders Chris Vermeulen and Loris Capirossi and the feedback from the MotoGP team and Suzuki test engineers.  A key focus area in refining the XRG1 was improving acceleration.  This was accomplished by refining every detail of the 2007 XRG0 engine and an updated Mitsubishi ECU.  The resulted engine redesigning provided lower fuel consumption and increased usability.  Further refinements of the XRG0 chassis for the 2008 XRG1 allowed for better cornering performance and change of direction.  Along with the chassis refinements, a newly designed fairing  was developed to reduce wind resistance to enhance handling characteristics.

At the end of 2011 Suzuki pulled out of MotoGP until at least 2014, citing the need to reduce costs amid the global economic downturn.

Specifications

References

MotoGP: 2010 Rizla Suzuki GSV-R MotoGP bike revealed

External links
 XRG1 specification at rizla-suzuki-motogp.co.uk

GSV-R
Grand Prix motorcycles
Motorcycles introduced in 2002